Alexander Johnston may refer to:
Alexander Johnston (1775–1849), British colonial official and orientalist in Ceylon
Alexander Johnston (Scottish politician) (1790–1844)
Alexander Keith Johnston (1804–1871), Scottish geographer
Alexander Robert Johnston (1812–1888), British colonial official
Alexander Johnston (artist) (1816–1891), Scottish painter
Alexander Keith Johnston (1844–1879), Scottish geographer
Alexander Johnston (footballer) (1881–1917), Scottish footballer
Alexander Johnston (historian) (died 1889), American historian
Alexander Johnston (Canadian politician) (1867–1951), Canadian journalist, civil servant and politician
Alexander Johnston (British Army officer) (1884–1952), Hampshire cricketer and army officer
Alexander W. Johnston (died 1932), Member of the Legislative Council of Samoa
Alex Johnston (Australian rules footballer) (1881–1965), Australian rules footballer
Alex Johnston (rugby league) (born 1995), Australian professional rugby league footballer

See also
Alexander Johnson (disambiguation)
Alexander Johnstone (disambiguation)